This is a list of notable female drummers.

A 

 Valerie Agnew (7 Year Bitch)
 Annette A. Aguilar (StringBeans)
 Carla Azar (Autolux)

B 

 Lori Barbero (Babes in Toyland)
 Christina Billotte (Bratmobile)
 Cindy Blackman (Santana, Lenny Kravitz, Jack Bruce, Pharoah Sanders, Ron Carter)
 Hannah Blilie (Gossip, Shoplifting)
 Rachel Blumberg (The Decemberists, M.Ward, Bright Eyes, Mirah, Jolie Holland, Califone, Death Vessel)
 Elaine Bradley (Neon Trees)
 Lauren Brown (He's My Brother She's My Sister)
 Nandi Bushell

C 

 Rachel Carns (The Need)
 Karen Carpenter (The Carpenters)
 Terri Lyne Carrington (Dizzy Gillespie, Stan Getz, Herbie Hancock)
 Neko Case (Maow)
 Torry Castellano (The Donnas)
 Régine Chassagne (Arcade Fire)
 Gemma Clarke (The Suffrajets, Babyshambles)
 Caroline Corr (The Corrs)

D 

 Adrienne Davies (Earth)
 Jessica Dobson
 Morgan Doctor (The Cliks, Andy Kim)

E 

 Sheila Escovedo (Sheila E.)
 Jan Errico (The Vejtables, The Mojo Men)

F 

 Amy Farina (The Evens)
 Florrie (Xenomania)
 Kathy Foster (All Girl Summer Fun Band)
 Temim Fruchter (The Shondes)

G 

 Evelyn Glennie
 Claudia Gonson (The Magnetic Fields)

H 

 Bobbye Hall (Bob Dylan, Janis Joplin, Marvin Gaye, Stevie Wonder, Carole King, Bill Withers, Pink Floyd, Tom Waits, Dolly Parton)
 Kathleen Hanna
 Kree Harrison
 Elaine Hoffman-Watts
 Brie Howard (Fanny)
 Georgia Hubley (Yo La Tengo)

I 

 Susie Ibarra

J 

 G. B. Jones (Fifth Column)
 Sarah Jones (Hot Chip, NYPC, Harry Styles)

K 

 Nao Kawakita
 Senri Kawaguchi

L 

 Honey Lantree of the Honeycombs, ("Have I the Right") - one of the first female rock drummers

 Jen Ledger (Skillet)
 Athena Lee (KrunK)
 Heather Lewis
 Jody Linscott (The Who, David Gilmour, Elton John)
 Sara Lund (Unwound)

M 

 Madonna (The Breakfast Club)
 Gina Mainwal (Sweet 75)
 Samantha Maloney (Hole, Mötley Crüe, Eagles of Death Metal)
 Akiko Matsuura (The Big Pink)
 Marilyn Mazur
 Linda McDonald (The Iron Maidens)
 Rose Melberg
 June Miles-Kingston (Everything But The Girl)
 Allison Miller
 Stanton Miranda
 Clare Moore (The Moodists)
 Ikue Mori (DNA)
 Lindy Morrison (The Go-Betweens)
 Stella Mozgawa (Warpaint, Courtney Barnett)

N 

 Molly Neuman (Bratmobile, The Frumpies, The PeeChees)

P 

 Palmolive (The Slits, The Raincoats, The Flowers of Romance)
 Mia Park
 Juanita Parra
 Debbi Peterson (The Bangles)
 Roxy Petrucci (Vixen)
 Demetra Plakas (L7)
 Paula P-Orridge (Psychic TV)
 Yoshimi P-We (Boredoms)

R 

 Frankie Rose (Dum Dum Girls, Vivian Girls)
 Dawn Richardson (4 Non Blondes, Bad Radio)

S 

 Kate Schellenbach (Beastie Boys, Luscious Jackson)
 Patty Schemel (Hole)
 Kim Schifino (Matt and Kim)
 Gina Schock (The Go-Go's)
 LaFrae Sci
 Dalia Shusterman (Hopewell, Bulletproof Stockings)
 Hilarie Sidney (The Apples in Stereo)
 Viola Smith
 Shannyn Sossamon (Warpaint)
 Scarlett Stevens (San Cisco)

T 

 Teresa Taylor (Butthole Surfers)
 Tennessee Thomas (The Like, NAF)
 Kimberly Thompson
 Lynn Truell ( The Dicks, Sister Double Happiness, Imperial Teen)
 Maureen Tucker (The Velvet Underground)

U 

 Ruth Underwood (Frank Zappa)

V 

 Tobi Vail (Bikini Kill)
 Sandra Vu (Dum Dum Girls)

W 

 Alicia Warrington (Chris Rene)
 Janet Weiss (Sleater-Kinney, Quasi, Wild Flag)
 Hannah Welton (3rdeyegirl)
 Sandy West (The Runaways)
 Meg White (The White Stripes)
 Kathi Wilcox (Bikini Kill)

Y 

 Melissa York (Born Against, Team Dresch)

See also 
 List of drummers

Drummers
Drummers